Courtney James Matthew Winston Tulloch (born 6 October 1995) is an English international artistic gymnast, representing Great Britain and England. A specialist in rings and vault, he is the double Commonwealth Games champion on rings in 2018 and 2022, and a silver medallist on vault, all representing England. Tulloch was also part of the gold medal-winning England team at the Commonwealth Games of 2018 and 2022.

Representing Great Britain, he was part of the gold medal-winning team at the 2022 European Artistic Gymnastics Championships, and a three-time European medal winner on rings. In November 2022 he became the first British gymnast ever to win a global medal on rings, a bronze, at the 2022 World Championships, having helped Great Britain to bronze, and Olympic qualification, in the team event days earlier.

Background

Tulloch trains at South Essex Gymnastics Club under coaches Anthony Wise & Scott Hann. He used to train at Pegasus Gymnastics Club in Maidstone under coaches Ovi Rugina & Ionut Trandaburu.

Junior career
During his junior career he was a two time all-around champion at the UK School Games and won several titles on rings. He was also part of the Junior British team that won the European title at the 2012 European Championships in Montpellier, as well as winning a gold medal on the rings.

Senior career
In 2013, he won a silver medal at the World Cup in Ljubljana on the rings.

In 2014, he was chosen to represent Great Britain at the 2014 World Artistic Gymnastics Championships in Nanning, China where he helped the men's team qualify to the final with performances on pommel horse, rings and parallel bars. He also qualified in 5th place for the rings final with a score of 15.700.

In 2018, he was selected to compete at the Commonwealth Games in Gold Coast, Australia. He took gold in the rings, and also won gold in the men's artistic team all-around. In the vault, he won silver.

At the 2018 European Championships in Glasgow, Tulloch won a bronze in the rings. He also won a silver as part of the team.

Tulloch was part of the England team that won gold in the team competition at the 2022 Commonwealth Games in Birmingham.

He is part of the Castore Sportswear Academy.

References

External links

 Courtney Tulloch at British Gymnastics
 
 
 

1995 births
Living people
British male artistic gymnasts
English male artistic gymnasts
Commonwealth Games medallists in gymnastics
Commonwealth Games gold medallists for England
Commonwealth Games silver medallists for England
Gymnasts at the 2018 Commonwealth Games
Gymnasts at the 2022 Commonwealth Games
European champions in gymnastics
Medalists at the World Artistic Gymnastics Championships
People from Lewisham
Medallists at the 2018 Commonwealth Games
Medallists at the 2022 Commonwealth Games